Menios Sakellaropoulos is a Greek journalist and novelist.

Career
Menios has worked in journalism since the summer of 1979 when he began to write a column for the athletic daily, Fos, while still a high school student. He studied at the Thrace Law School, but left to pursue a different path as a journalist and writer.

He did his apprenticeship at the Athens daily newspapers Vradyni, Ethnos, Athlitiki, Sportime and Derby. He then also began to work for television at the state channels ERA and Sport FM. Since 1992 he has been working for Mega channel. He is a member of the Journalists’ Union and the Pan-Hellenic Athletic Press Association.

Works
 Laura’s Night
 You’re Going to Die, Man!
 The Game Boy – the Fatal 10
 20 Years of Travel

His novels are published by Livani Publishing Organization, plus a special diary publication called The Olympic Games: History and Legend.

Greek novelists
Year of birth missing (living people)
Living people